Lake & Flames is the second album by Polish band The Car Is on Fire. It was produced by Leszek Biolik (Republika). It won the Fryderyk for Best Alternative Album of 2006 and was voted the best album of the year by listeners of Polish Radio 3 (as was its first single Can't Cook (Who Cares?)). The album features many string/horn arrangements, synths and vocal harmonies as opposed to the raw garage style of the group's debut album.

Track listing
 The Car Is On Fire Early Morning Internazionale
 Can't Cook (Who Cares?)
 Iran / China
 Nexteam
 Stockholm
 Parker Posey
 North By Northwest
 Such A Lovely
 When The Sun Goes Down
 Seventeen
 Ex Sex Is (Not) The Best (Title)
 Neyorkewr
 Oh, Joe
 Take Me There
 It's Finally Over
 Kiss Kiss
 Red Rocker
 Falling Asleep And Waking Up
 What Life's All About
 Got Them CDs Babe, Thanks A Bunch
 JW Construction
 Love.
 Lake & Flames

References 

2006 albums
The Car Is on Fire albums